The IIHF World Championship Division IV is an annual sports event organized by the International Ice Hockey Federation (IIHF). The division has been introduced for the 2020 Men's Ice Hockey World Championships, and forms the lowest level of the IIHF World Championships.

Results
The national team that wins the Division IV championship will be promoted to the following year's Division III B championship, and will be replaced by the team relegated down from Division III B.

Summary of participation
Includes participation in Division IV only, see each team's main article to see their results at all levels of past Ice Hockey World Championships.

1 championship participation list announced

See also
Ice Hockey World Championships
IIHF World Championship Division I
IIHF World Championship Division II
IIHF World Championship Division III

References

External links
IIHF Official website